Paget Jackson Toynbee, FBA (1855–1932) was a British Dante scholar. Robert Hollander has described Toynbee as 'the most influential Dantean scholar of his time'.

Toynbee also provided thousands of quotes for the Oxford English Dictionary.

Works
A Dictionary of Proper Names and Notable Matters in the Works of Dante (Oxford: Clarendon Press, 1898) 
revised, 1968, Charles S. Singleton
Dante studies and researches (1902)
'A Chronological List of English Translations from Dante from Chaucer to the present day' in The twenty-ninth annual report of the Dante Society (Cambridge, Massachusetts) 1905 (1906)
Dante Alighieri His Life and Works (1910)
'An unrecorded seventeenth century version of the Vita di Dante of Leonardo Bruni' in The twenty-ninth annual report of the Dante Society (Cambridge, Massachusetts) 1910 (1912) 
Concise Dictionary of Proper Names and Notable Matters in the Works of Dante (Oxford: Clarendon Press, 1914)
The Correspondence of Gray, Walpole, West and Ashton (1734-1771) (Oxford: Clarendon Press, 1915). Editor
'History of the letters of Dante from the fourteenth century to the present day' in The thirty-sixth annual report of the Dante Society (Cambridge, Massachusetts) 1917 (1919) 
'Dante in English art' in The thirty-eighth annual report of the Dante Society (Cambridge, Massachusetts) 1919 (1921) 
Dante Studies (Oxford: Clarendon Press, 1921)
'The Oxford Dante' in The forty-second, forty-third, and forty-fourth annual report of the Dante Society (Cambridge, Massachusetts) 1926 (1926) 
Thomas Gray, Correspondence (Oxford: Clarendon Press, 1935). Editor with Leonard Whibley
Dantis Allegherii Epistolae: The Letters of Dante (Oxford: Clarendon Press, 1966). Editor

The Letters of Horace Walpole. 16 volumes. (Oxford: Clarendon Press, 1903-5). Editor (Made in collaboration with Helen Wrigley Toynbee, his wife)

Legacy

In the years immediately before his death, Toynbee donated manuscripts, papers and correspondence relating to Dante and to Horace Walpole to the Bodleian Library. Further papers were bequeathed by him in 1932.

The Paget Toynbee lectures on Dante have taken place annually in Oxford since 1995.

References

External links
 

Academics of the University of Oxford
1855 births
1932 deaths
Dante scholars